Sharon Ní Bheoláin (approximately ; born Boland on 15 February 1971) is an Irish journalist, newsreader and presenter with Raidió Teilifís Éireann (RTÉ), Ireland's national public service radio and television broadcaster, for which she has presented many flagship programmes including Nuacht RTÉ, RTÉ News: One O'Clock and RTÉ News: Six One as well as all other news bulletins on both radio and television.

In 2018, she became the co-anchor of RTÉ News: Nine O'Clock sharing presenting duties with Eileen Dunne, while it was also announced that she would present Crimecall every month along with presenting Leaders' Questions every Wednesday and Thursday morning during the Dáil term.

Early life and education
Sharon Boland was born in Malahide, County Dublin, 15 February 1971. Though not a native Irish speaker, she graduated from Trinity College Dublin (TCD), with a Bachelor of Arts honours degree in early and modern Irish in 1992.

Career
Before joining RTÉ, she worked for the Dublin radio station, Raidió Na Life.

Ní Bheoláin began her career with RTÉ in 1994, presenting Nuacht RTÉ and in 1997, she became the presenter of News 2. Throughout the early 2000s, she had sporadic appearances on various RTÉ News programmes, including the Six One News, the Nine O'Clock News and on RTÉ Two's news programmes. In 2005, she became permanent co-presenter of the Six One News. In November 2013, Ní Bheoláin revealed that she would be leaving Six One News to pursue something new.

She also presented the short-run RTÉ series Turas Teanga, which helped viewers learn the Irish language.

In 2018, she became the co-anchor of the Nine O'Clock News, sharing presenting duties with Eileen Dunne.

Personal life
Ní Bheoláin married cameraman Kevin Cantrell in 1999, settling in Clontarf; they have one daughter. They split up in 2005. Her partner since 2009 is vet Finbarr Heslin.

In 2014, she was the victim of two online stalkers.

References

External links
 RTÉ's Six One News

1971 births
20th-century Irish people
21st-century Irish people
Living people
Alumni of Trinity College Dublin
Irish radio presenters
Irish women radio presenters
Irish women television presenters
RTÉ newsreaders and journalists
People from Malahide